is a Japanese professional baseball pitcher who is currently a free agent. He has played in Nippon Professional Baseball (NPB) for the Tokyo Yakult Swallows and Tohoku Rakuten Golden Eagles.

Early life
Sato was born in Sendai, the capital city of Miyagi Prefecture. His parents and older brother convinced him to begin playing baseball in the fourth grade. (His brother, Hisanori, would later go on to Tohoku High School, where he would become batterymates with current Hokkaido Nippon-Ham Fighters right-hander Yu Darvish as the team's backup catcher.) He was chosen to the Little League Japanese national team in his first year (the equivalent of seventh grade in the United States) at Sendai Municipal North Sendai Junior High School and pitched a no-hitter against the Russian team, but did not play for his school's baseball team, instead choosing to join the school's track and field team while playing for a Little Senior team instead.

High school career

2005 to Spring 2007
Sato went on to enroll at Sendai Ikuei Gakuen High School in 2005. Though he failed to reach even  when he entered high school and was initially made the backup third baseman, he was clocking  by the fall of his first year (tenth grade) and began to draw local attention as a pitcher. He led the school to a berth in the 88th National High School Baseball Championship in the summer of his junior year (2006), going the distance while striking out 11 en route to a 5–1 win over Tokushima Commercial High School in the first round as the team's ace pitcher on 7 August. However, he allowed four runs on seven hits and five walks despite striking out 13 against Nihon University Yamagata Senior High School in the next round, ultimately being charged with the decision in a 6–3 loss on 13 August.

Sendai Ikuei Gakuen High won the Tohoku Regional Tournament that fall, securing a berth in the 79th National High School Baseball Invitational Tournament that would be held in the spring of 2007. However, while Sato pitched well against Tokoha Gakuen Kikugawa High School in the first round (now as a senior) on 23 March, striking out 14 while allowing just two runs and clocking , his team was held to just one run in a disappointing 2–1 loss and first-round exit (Tokoha Gakuen Kikugawa High went on to become the tournament champions).

Summer 2007
Already viewed as one of the top high school pitchers in the country, Sato pitched well in the regional Miyagi Tournament that summer, throwing 226 pitches in fifteen shutout innings in the finals against rival Tohoku High School on 31 July in what ended in a scoreless tie (as per tournament regulations). He started the rematch that ensued the next day (1 August), throwing 148 pitches while holding Tohoku High to two runs in a 6–2 complete game win and leading the school to a third straight appearance in a national tournament.

Sato took the mound against Chiben Gakuen Wakayama Senior High School in the first round of the 89th National High School Baseball Championship that followed on 9 August, holding the team to just two runs while striking out 17 in a 4–2 complete-game win.

He gave up five runs in the very next inning, however, allowing eight hits and five walks in a 5–2 complete game loss. While he made three appearances in national tournaments during his three-year high school career, he never succeeded in getting past the second round.

Sato was chosen to play in the U.S.−Japan High School Baseball Tournament (organized by the Japanese Educational Resource Center in conjunction with the Major League Baseball Urban Youth Academy) as a member of the Japanese team later that summer, clocking a new personal-high  during the tournament.

Sato was one of the most highly touted players going into the 2007 NPB high school draft, attracting the attention of scouts for not only his fastball but also his hard slider and being dubbed one of the "High School Big Three" along with Osaka Tōin Senior High School slugger Sho Nakata and Narita High School right-hander Yuki Karakawa. The Sendai-based Tohoku Rakuten Golden Eagles, Swallows, BayStars, Chunichi Dragons and Yomiuri Giants all selected Sato with their first-round picks, but the Swallows drew the winning straw, signing him to a base salary of 15 million yen, a signing bonus of 100 million yen and additional performance-based incentives and presenting him the uniform number 11 on 11 November.

Professional career

2008
In , his rookie season, Sato was assigned to the Swallows' ichigun (Japanese equivalent of "major league") team for Spring training, but complained of pain in his left ankle in late February. While the condition was deemed minor and Sato was cleared to play in preseason games, he went 0–2 with a 13.50 ERA, allowing 14 hits in just six innings, and was sent down to the nigun team ("minor league" or "farm team") for the season opener. He focused on rehabbing his ankle, coming on in relief in a game against the Giants on 13 April and pitching one scoreless inning in his Eastern League debut.

Sato went on to earn a spot in the nigun team's starting rotation, going 8–5 with a 4.17 ERA in 15 appearances and striking out 71 in  innings before being called up to the ichigun team for the first time in late August. He made his professional debut on 30 August, starting a game against the BayStars but giving up six runs (five earned) on six hits and lasting just  innings (the Swallows came back to win the game 9–8).

Sato made his second start in a game against the Giants on 6 September, allowing three runs over six innings while striking out eight for the first win of his professional career and snapping the Swallows' eight-game losing streak to the Giants (prompting the Japanese media to dub him the "Giants Killer"). However, he was charged with his first loss in his next start against the Giants on 14 September, allowing three runs over six innings while striking out seven (he knocked in his first career RBI on a sacrifice fly in the fifth inning).

On 8 October, Sato earned his second win of the season against the BayStars, holding the team to one run on just two hits over eight innings. While manager Shigeru Takada considered sending Sato to the mound for the ninth, he opted against it after Sato told pitching coach Daisuke Araki that he would rather retain his eligibility for the Most Valuable Rookie award for the following season than earn his first complete-game win.

Sato finished the year with a 2–1 record in five starts (six appearances), recording a 4.55 ERA while striking out 28 in  innings. His eight wins with the nigun team also led the Eastern League.

2009
Sato pitched well in the  pre-season, going 1–0 with one save with a 2.37 ERA in four appearances, and was considered one of the favorites for the Central League Most Valuable Rookie award going into the season.

Sato took the mound in the Swallows' second game of the season against the Hanshin Tigers on 4 April, holding them to one run over six innings in his first win of the season, but gave up a career-high seven runs (all earned) on nine hits over just  innings in his next start against the BayStars on 10 April.

While he threw a pitch clocked at a personal-high  in his fourth start against the BayStars on 26 April, Sato walked four and gave up three runs in just one inning in the shortest outing of his career. He was removed from the active roster and sent down to the minors the following day.

On 2 December 2020, he become a free agent.

Pitching style
He has a slightly unorthodox delivery, raising his left leg and bringing his glove down in front of his knee before pulling it into his chest and throwing from a three-quarters arm slot.

Sato complements the pitch with a solid slider at low-80s and an occasional forkball. Sato can be considered as a two-pitch pitcher and still has a problem in his control.

Sato has excellent stamina, clocking  with his final pitch in his 154-pitch complete-game win against Chiben Gakuen Wakayama Senior High in the National High School Baseball Championship as an 18-year-old, but leaves room for improvement with his command.

References

External links

1989 births
Living people
Baseball people from Sendai
Japanese baseball players
Nippon Professional Baseball pitchers
Tokyo Yakult Swallows players
Tohoku Rakuten Golden Eagles players